Arthur William Blaxall (15 May 1891 – 5 December 1970) was a British South African Anglican priest who for most of his life lived and worked in South Africa especially known for his ministry among the blind and the deaf.

Biography 

Arthur William  Blaxall was born in Britain on 15 May 1891. He served in  World War I as a medical orderly, worked as a missioner to the deaf in Birmingham and went to South Africa in 1923, together with his wife Florence. He founded the Ezenzeleni workshop for the blind at Roodepoort in 1939.

In 1954, he founded the Arthur Blaxall School for the Blind, but it was forced to change its name when he was exiled for his opposition to the National Party government in 1964.

In the 1960s, he was secretary of the South African branch of the Fellowship of Reconciliation, a pacifist organisation.
He was invited by Nelson Mandela to visit him whilst he awaited trial, which he did on three occasions when they prayed together.
In 1963, he was charged with various offences under the Suppression of Communism Act, and given a suspended sentence, mainly on grounds of his age, and went into exile in the UK.

Publications 

 
  His autobiography written in exile in England.

Notes

References 

 
 

1891 births
1970 deaths
Anglican pacifists
20th-century South African Anglican priests
South African Christian pacifists